The Devil and the Madonna (German: Der Teufel und die Madonna) is a 1919 German silent drama film directed by Carl Boese and starring Gertrude Welcker, Magnus Stifter and Reinhold Schünzel.

The film's sets were designed by the art director Hans Dreier.

Cast
 Magnus Stifter as Doktor Canzarro / Teufel 
 Gertrude Welcker as Tochter Gesina Tradler 
 Ernst Pittschau as Graf Jervis 
 Emil Rameau as Meister Tradler 
 Reinhold Schünzel

References

Bibliography
 Bock, Hans-Michael & Bergfelder, Tim. The Concise CineGraph. Encyclopedia of German Cinema. Berghahn Books, 2009.

External links

1919 films
Films of the Weimar Republic
German silent feature films
Films directed by Carl Boese
German black-and-white films
German drama films
1919 drama films
Silent drama films
1910s German films